Forky is a fictional character in the Toy Story franchise created by Disney and Pixar. His first appearance is in Toy Story 4, which was released in June 2019. In the Toy Story universe, he was made by Bonnie, who stuck googly eyes and red pipe cleaner onto a spork. He is also the titular protagonist of the series of shorts Forky Asks a Question on Disney+.

Concept and creation
While considering names for the character, director Josh Cooley showed a picture of the character to his four-year-old son and asked for a suggestion on the name. Cooley's son suggested the name ForkFace, and Cooley later said "the fact that he's around the same age as Bonnie and didn't know what a spork was, I thought, 'That feels real to me.' So Forky felt like a kid would name him that."

Character overview
Forky is a white plastic spork outfitted with a pair of different sized googly eyes; a mouth made out of blue plasticine; two halves of a popsicle stick for feet, stuck on with modelling clay; arms and hands made out of a red pipe cleaner; and a unibrow made out of red plasticine. Bonnie's name is written on the bottom of his feet, and he has a rainbow sticker on his left foot.

Attributes

Forky is innocent and self-loathing.  From the moment he comes to life, he is convinced  that he is "trash". This attitude gradually changes after he befriends Woody and his gang, although his naïveté and inquisitive yet dim-witted behavior remain.

Appearances

Toy Story 4
Forky is first seen during the orientation at Bonnie's kindergarten class, where he was created with the help of Woody who scavenged parts from the trash bin for a craft project. As he and Woody came back home while inside Bonnie's backpack, Forky comes to life. Woody presents Forky to the rest of the gang; Forky, convinced that he is more of a piece of trash than a toy, doggedly tries to find solace in the nearest trash bin.

During the road trip, Forky escapes from the RV and finds his way on a highway, much to Woody's horror. Woody chases him and persuades him to become Bonnie's toy, passing by an antique store at the Historic Grand Basin, where Woody notices Bo Peep's lamp. The two encounter a talking doll named Gabby Gabby, who claims to know about Bo Peep's whereabouts; Woody senses an ulterior motive and tries to escape from the Bensons, Gabby Gabby's ventriloquist dummy bodyguards, but Forky is taken captive. While being held as Gabby's hostage, Forky naively recalls the stories Woody told about his time with Andy.

At the playground, Woody reunites with Bo Peep and convinces her to rescue Forky from Gabby Gabby and her minions. Bo Peep reluctantly agrees "for old time's sake", and they hatch a plan to rescue Forky along with Buzz Lightyear, Duke Caboom, Giggle McDimples and Ducky and Bunny. The rescue mission turns out to be a failure, leading to an argument with Woody and Bo Peep, with Woody declaring having nothing to lose except for Forky. Woody and the other toys part ways; alone, Woody confronts Gabby Gabby again, who upon learning about Woody's memories based on what Forky divulged, expresses her desire to be loved by a child. Woody and Gabby then make a compromise – Woody giving up his voice box in exchange for Forky's freedom.

Woody was about to get in Bonnie's backpack when Forky calls him back as he witnesses Gabby's encounter with her ideal girl, Harmony; Harmony rejects the doll as uninteresting and leaves Gabby Gabby heartbroken. Not wanting to leave Gabby to suffer a miserable existence, Woody convinces the doll to join him and become one of Bonnie's toys, while tasking Forky to fetch Buzz and Bonnie's toys; they interfere with the RV's controls, forcing Bonnie's father to drive back to the carnival. When Gabby Gabby sees a crying girl lost in the carnival, she decides instead to become that child's toy, emboldening the child to approach a security guard and be reunited with her parents. Forky is then tasked to lock out Bonnie and her parents from the RV, buying the toys enough time to meet up with Bo Peep and Woody.

At the carousel, Woody and Bo share a bittersweet goodbye; Woody decides to stay with Bo and live a new life together as lost toys, and Forky bids farewell. The RV departs with Bonnie's toys as Woody and Bo begin a life together, dedicated to finding new owners for lost toys.

In a mid-credits sequence, Bonnie creates a female toy out of a plastic knife on her first day of first grade. The knife toy, named Knifey, suffers from the same existential crisis as Forky, who becomes smitten with her, and promises to answer all of her questions. When asked how she is alive, Forky simply replies "I don't know."

Disney Magic Kingdoms
Forky is a playable character in the world builder video game Disney Magic Kingdoms, being a premium character to unlock in the main storyline of the game.

Forky Asks a Question

Forky returns as the protagonist in a series of shorts exclusive to Disney+, where every episode he asks a question about the world around him. Bonnie's toys make occasional appearances to help him learn.

Pixar Popcorn
Forky appeared as a minor character in Pixar Popcorn, a Disney+ series which premiered in 2021.

See also
 Office Assistant

References

Toy Story characters
Animated characters in film
Film characters introduced in 2019
Animated characters introduced in 2019
2010s toys
Forks
Male characters in animated films
Male characters in animation